Carlos Barreto (born 22 July 1968, in Rio de Janeiro is a retired Brazilian mixed martial arts fighter, bjj coach, Black House founder who was trained by the legendary Carlson Gracie. A veteran of both the UFC and Pride Fighting Championships, Barreto holds notable wins over Ben Rothwell, Kevin Randleman and Dan Bobish. He won the IVC Heavyweight Championship in 1999.

Background
Barreto trained in Muay Thai as a teenager. After meeting Ricardo Liborio, he began attending jiu-jitsu training at the  Carlson Gracie academy.

Black House (MMA) 
Carlos Barreto along with Ed Soares, Jorge Guimaraes,Rogerio Camoes founded Black House gym in 2006. Black House offers classes in Brazilian Jiu-Jitsu, Muay Thai and Boxing  . UFC champions  Anderson Silva, Lyoto Machida, José Aldo, Junior dos Santos, Glover Teixeira trained in Black House.

Grappling
Barreto took part in 1999  ADCC World Championships and lost to Mark Kerr. Next year he took part in 2000 ADCC World Championships and lost to Sean Alvarez in absolute weight category and lost to Ricco Rodriguez in +99 weight category.

MMA
Barreto made his MMA debut in 1996 and won experienced Russian fighter Mikhail Ilyukhin. In 1996 he took part in Universal Vale Tudo Fighting 6 grand prix. He won Dan Bobish in semifinal, and Kevin Randleman in final. After that tournament he made his UFC debut and took part in UFC 15 4 fighters heavyweight tournament. He was defeated by Dave Beneteau. After victoires over Branden Lee Hinkle and Pedro Otavio Barreto Barreto met Igor Vovchanchyn at Pride 6 and loss fight by split decision. After defeating  Gary Myers he fought second time  in Pride and defeated Tra Telligman via TKO .  In 2000 he made debut in Rings and lost to Chris Haseman. 2001 -st year was not successful, Barreto lost fights to Gilbert Yvel and Ian Freeman. In 2002 Barreto hold victories over Marcelo Souza and Ben Rothwell. Then he met Travis Wiuff and loss fight. Next opponent was Bobby Hoffman and Barreto won that fight. After three consecutive loss Barreto retired from competiiton.

Personal life
After retirement Barreto worked as coach, fight analyst and tried himself as a promoter. In 2023, Barreto began working as a member of the commentary team for UFC Fight Pass Brazil.

Championships and accomplishments
International Vale Tudo Championship
IVC IVC Heavyweight Championship (One time)
International Vale Tudo Championship
IVC Superfight Championship (One time)
Meca World Vale Tudo
MWVT Heavyweight Championship (One time)
Universal Vale Tudo
UVC 6 Tournament Winner (1996)

Mixed martial arts record

|-
| Loss
| align=center| 14–9
| Vladimir Matyushenko
| TKO (knee injury)
| Jungle Fight 4
| 
| align=center| 1
| align=center| 0:26
| Manaus, Brazil
| 
|-
| Loss
| align=center| 14–8
| Martin Malkhasyan
| Decision (unanimous)
| M-1 MFC: Heavyweight GP
| 
| align=center| 2
| align=center| 5:00
| Moscow, Russia
| 
|-
| Loss
| align=center| 14–7
| Aleksander Emelianenko
| Decision (unanimous)
| M-1 MFC: Middleweight GP
| 
| align=center| 3
| align=center| 5:00
| St. Petersburg, Russia
| 
|-
| Win
| align=center| 14–6
| Bobby Hoffman
| TKO (submission to punches)
| Jungle Fight 2
| 
| align=center| 2
| align=center| n/a
| Manaus, Brazil
| 
|-
| Loss
| align=center| 13–6
| Travis Wiuff
| Decision (unanimous)
| Heat FC 2
| 
| align=center| 3
| align=center| 5:00
| Natal, Brazil
| 
|-
| Win
| align=center| 13–5
| Ben Rothwell
| KO (head kick)
| Heat FC 1
| 
| align=center| 1
| align=center| N/A
| Natal, Brazil
| 
|-
| Win
| align=center| 12–5
| Marcelo Souza
| TKO (doctor stoppage)
| Meca World Vale Tudo 6
| 
| align=center| 1
| align=center| 7:08
| Curitiba, Brazil
| |
|-
| Loss
| align=center| 11–5
| Ian Freeman
| Decision (unanimous)
| HOOKnSHOOT Kings 1
| 
| align=center| 3
| align=center| 5:00
| Evansville, Indiana
| 
|-
| Loss
| align=center| 11–4
| Gilbert Yvel
| KO (flying knee)
| 2 Hot 2 Handle 2
| 
| align=center| 1
| align=center| 2:20
| Rotterdam, the Netherlands
| 
|-
| Loss
| align=center| 11-3
| Chris Haseman
| Decision (unanimous)
| Rings: King of Kings 2000 Block B
| 
| align=center| 2
| align=center| 5:00
| Osaka, Japan
| 
|-
| Win
| align=center| 11–2
| Tra Telligman
| TKO (corner stoppage)
| Pride 9
| 
| align=center| 2
| align=center| 10:00
| Nagoya, Japan
| 
|-
| Win
| align=center| 10–2
| Gary Myers
| Submission (broken leg)
| International Vale Tudo Championship 12
| 
| align=center| 1
| align=center| 8:13
| Sao Paulo, Brazil
| .
|-
| Loss
| align=center| 9-2
| Igor Vovchanchyn
| Decision (split)
| Pride 6
| 
| align=center| 3
| align=center| 5:00
| Yokohama, Japan
| 
|-
| Win
| align=center| 9-1
| Pedro Otavio
| TKO (submission to punches)
| International Vale Tudo Championship 10
| 
| align=center| 1
| align=center| 6:19
| Brazil
| .
|-
| Win
| align=center| 8-1
| Branden Lee Hinkle
| Submission (guillotine choke)
| International Vale Tudo Championship 8
| 
| align=center| 1
| align=center| 4:32
| Aracaju, Brazil
| 
|-
| Loss
| align=center| 7–1
| Dave Beneteau
| Decision (unanimous)
| UFC 15
| 
| align=center| 1
| align=center| 15:00
| Bay St. Louis, Mississippi, United States
| 
|-
| Win
| align=center| 7–0
| Paul Varelans
| TKO (elbows and punches)
| Brazil Open '97
| 
| align=center| 1
| align=center| 2:33
| Brazil
| 
|-
| Win
| align=center| 6–0
| Kevin Randleman
| Technical Submission (triangle choke)
| Universal Vale Tudo Fighting 6
| 
| align=center| 1
| align=center| 22:24
| Brazil
| 
|-
| Win
| align=center| 5–0
| Dan Bobish
| Submission (triangle choke)
| Universal Vale Tudo Fighting 6
| 
| align=center| 1
| align=center| 7:47
| Brazil
| 
|-
| Win
| align=center| 4–0
| Geza Kalman
| Submission (guillotine choke)
| Universal Vale Tudo Fighting 6
| 
| align=center| 1
| align=center| 3:02
| Brazil
| 
|-
| Win
| align=center| 3–0
| Alexander Rafalski
| TKO (corner stoppage)
| Martial Arts Reality Superfighting
| 
| align=center| 1
| align=center| 1:00
| Birmingham, Alabama, United States
| 
|-
| Win
| align=center| 2–0
| John Dixson
| TKO (submission to punches)
| Universal Vale Tudo Fighting 2
| 
| align=center| 1
| align=center| 1:38
| Brazil
| 
|-
| Win
| align=center| 1–0
| Mikhail Ilyukhin
| Submission (rear-naked choke)
| Universal Vale Tudo Fighting 1
| 
| align=center| 2
| align=center| 3:15
| Japan
|

Submission grappling record 
{| class="wikitable sortable" style="font-size:80%; text-align:left;"
|-
| colspan=8 style="text-align:center;" |  ? Matches, ? Wins, ? Losses, ? Draws
|-
!  Result
!  Rec.
!  Opponent
!  Method
!  text-center| Event
!  Date
!  Location
|-
|  Loss ||align=center|1–2–0||  Ricco Rodriguez ||  Decision · Points|| 2000 ADCC World Championships || March 1, 2000||  Abu Dhabi, United Arab Emirates
|-
|  Loss ||align=center|1–2–0||  Sean Alvarez ||  Decision · Points|| 2000 ADCC World Championships || March 1, 2000||  Abu Dhabi, United Arab Emirates
|-
|  Loss ||align=center|1–1–0||  Mark Kerr ||  Decision · Points|| 1999 ADCC World Championships || February 24, 1999 ||  Abu Dhabi, United Arab Emirates 
|-
|  Win ||align=center|1–0–0||  Paulo Teodoro ||  Decision · Points|| 1996 IBJJF World Jiu-Jitsu Championship || February 4, 1996 ||  Rio de Janeiro, Brasil 
|-

Kickboxing record (incomplete)

|-  bgcolor="#FFBBBB"
|  2003-03-23 || Loss ||align=left| Luis Dos Santos  || K-1: Brazil 2003 || Sao Paulo, Brazil || Decision || 3 || 3:00 ||0-1

See also
List of male mixed martial artists
List of UFC champions
List of current UFC fighters

References

External links
 
 Carlos Barreto at Pride FC (archived)
 
 

1968 births
Living people
Brazilian male mixed martial artists
Brazilian practitioners of Brazilian jiu-jitsu
People awarded a black belt in Brazilian jiu-jitsu
Brazilian Muay Thai practitioners
Heavyweight mixed martial artists
Mixed martial artists utilizing Muay Thai
Mixed martial artists utilizing Brazilian jiu-jitsu
Sportspeople from Rio de Janeiro (city)
Ultimate Fighting Championship male fighters